Air Bashkortostan, LLC was an airline based in Ufa, Bashkortostan, Russia. It operated scheduled flights and charters between its base at Ufa International Airport and Moscow Domodedovo Airport on flights operated by VIM Airlines with their aircraft.

History

Air Bashkortostan was founded in 2006, based from the now defunct BAL Bashkirian Airlines. The airline started operations on April 10, 2006, It was owned by VIM Airlines (74%) and the government of Bashkortostan (26%) and had 101 employees (at March 2007).

In 2010 the airline decided to venture into aerial imaging so put into operation one Diamond DA-42 specially equipped for this purpose.

In August 2011, the Government of Bashkortostan presented claims to the airline regarding the use of the name "Bashkortostan", arguing that the airline is not a solid enterprise, which undermines the image of the republic. The airline's management refused to consider the possibility of changing the name, as they are sure that its use is not a violation of current legislation

On October 1, 2013, the airline has stopped carrying out passenger traffic. Its remaining 3 Boeing 757-200 were transferred back to the fleet of VIM Airlines. On October 9, 2013, Air Bashkortostan was closed down by its parent company VIM ahead of the airline's fleet renewal program, its license was annulled by Rosaviatsia

On January 10, 2014, the Federal Air Transport Agency canceled the operator's certificate for commercial air transportation No. 490, issued on May 24, 2006.

Fleet
The Air Bashkortostan fleet included the following aircraft (as of December 2013):

See also
List of defunct airlines of Russia

References

External links
Official website

Defunct airlines of Russia
Airlines established in 2006
Airlines disestablished in 2013
Companies based in Ufa
2006 establishments in Russia
2013 disestablishments in Russia